Vasilyok is a rural locality (a settlement) in Komarichsky District, Bryansk Oblast, Russia. The population was 55 as of 2010. There is 1 street.

Geography 
Vasilyok is located 30 km south of Komarichi (the district's administrative centre) by road. Trostenchik is the nearest rural locality.

References 

Rural localities in Komarichsky District